Newton Abbot Community Hospital is a health facility on Jetty Marsh Road in Newton Abbot, Devon, England. It is managed by Torbay and South Devon NHS Foundation Trust.

History
The hospital was commissioned to replace the old Newton Abbot Hospital in East Street. The new facility was procured under a private finance initiative contract in 2007 and was designed by Murphy Philipps and built by Rydon at a cost of £20million. The hospital, which opened in January 2009, was awarded "Best Community Care Design" in the Building Better Healthcare Awards in 2009.

References

External links

Hospitals in Devon
Hospital buildings completed in 2009
NHS hospitals in England
Newton Abbot